Martti Juhani Järventie (born April 4, 1976) is a Finnish former professional ice hockey defenceman. He was selected by the Montreal Canadiens in the 4th round (109th overall) of the 2001 NHL Entry Draft and played one game in the National Hockey League for Montreal during the 2001–02 NHL season.

Career
Järventie began his career with Ilves where he spent a total of nine years, beginning at junior level in 1992. In 1995 he had spells with KOO-VEE and Lukko before returning to Ilves. In 2001, he moved to TPS. Järventie was drafted 109th overall by the Montreal Canadiens in the 2001 NHL Entry Draft but managed to play just one game in the NHL, having been assigned to the American Hockey League's Quebec Citadelles.

Afterwards, Järventie returned to Ilves before joining Jokerit.  After five seasons, Järventie moved to the Swedish Elitserien for Mora IK for one season before returning to the SM-liiga with Kärpät. In 2009, he joined HIFK and won the SM-Liiga championship with the team in 2011. In June 2011 Järventie returned to Tampere after signing a four-year contract with Ilves. During autumn 2015 Järventie played some games in HPK before his transfer to Milton Keynes Lightning.

Career statistics

Regular season and playoffs

International

External links 
 

1976 births
Living people
Finnish ice hockey defencemen
HIFK (ice hockey) players
HPK players
Ilves players
Jokerit players
KOOVEE players
Lukko players
Milton Keynes Lightning players
Montreal Canadiens draft picks
Montreal Canadiens players
Mora IK players
Oulun Kärpät players
Quebec Citadelles players
Ice hockey people from Tampere
HC TPS players